Mila Serhiivna Nitich (Людмила Сергіївна Нитичук; born 26 September 1990, Stara Syniava) is a Ukrainian singer.

Life 
Her mother was Oksana Volodymyrivna an economist, and father was Serhiy Mykolayovych, a musician, and sound director.

In 2002 she moved with her parents to Khmelnytsky, where in 2003 she began taking vocal lessons. When Lyudmila turned sixteen, she began working with the Ukraine Symphony Orchestra. Thanks to her concert activities, she gained good practice in the field of singing. In 2007, she entered Khmelnytskyi National University.

She became a participant in the tenth season of the TV project "Chance" and reached the finals.  In the summer of 2009 she competed in the "New Wave 2009"  competition and took 7th place.

In 2009–2019, Lyudmila collaborated with producer Volodymyr Bebeshko.

In April 2021, Mila Nitic performed live on the vocal show "Voice of the Country".

References 

1990 births
Living people
21st-century Ukrainian women singers